Maximilian Jacob Herzberger (7 or 17 Mar 1899, Berlin, Germany — 9 Apr 1982, New Orleans, United States) was a German-American mathematician and physicist, known for his development of the superachromat lens.

Life
Maximilian Herzberger was the son of Leopold Herzberger (born 7 Mar 1870, Krefeld — died in Rochester (NY)) and Sonja/Sofia Behrendt/Berendt/Berends (22 Mar 1876, Petersburg (Germany) — 28 Jan 1945, Florence); he had a sister Olga (24 Sep 1897, Berlin — 2 Aug 1922, Berlin). The family was Jewish.
He studied mathematics and physics at the Berlin University, where Albert Einstein was one of his professors, and later became a friend and advisor.
In 1923, Herzberger finished his Ph.D. thesis Ueber Systeme hyperkomplexer Grössen under Ludwig Bieberbach and Issai Schur at the philosophical faculty.
In 1925, he married Edith Kaufmann (10 Oct 1901, Stuttgart — 16 Feb 2001, Carlsbad (California) or New Orleans);
they had three children, born in Jena, viz. Ruth (born 1928), Ursula Bellugi (1931), and Hans (6 Aug 1932, spouse of Radhika Herzberger).
No later than Sep 1930, he was assistant of Hans Boegehold,(de) the chief of calculation office at Carl Zeiss Jena.

In 1934, the Nazis deprived him from his professorship at Jena University and his contract with Zeiss. He emigrated with his family to Rochester (NY),
where he became head of Eastman Kodak's optical research laboratories, arranged by Einstein.
In 1940, he and his family became U.S. citizens.
In 1945, he got the Cressy Morrison Award of the New York Academy of Sciences.

In 1954 he finished the development of the superachromat as the ultimately well-corrected lens for Kodak.
In 1962, he was awarded the Frederic Ives Medal of the Optical Society of America.<ref>[http://www.opticsinfobase.org/josa/abstract.cfm?uri=josa-53-6-657 Maximilian J. Herzberger Frederic Ives Medalist for 1962], JOSA, Vol. 53, Issue 6, pp. 657-657 (1963)</ref>
In 1965, he retired from his position at Kodak, and helped building a graduate institute for optics in Switzerland,
until in 1968 he followed invitation of the University of New Orleans to teach at their Physics Department.

He held patents for an "apochromatic telescope objective having three air spaced components", and a "superachromatic objective".

Publications
 Ueber Systeme hyperkomplexer Grössen, Max Herzberger, Berlin, 1923, Ebering.
 Untersuchungen über die Eigenschaften erster Ordnung von reellen Strahlensystemen, Jan 1928, De Gruyter, 
 Untersuchungen über die Eigenschaften erster Ordnung von reellen Strahlensystemen, in: Journal für die reine und angewandte Mathematik, Vol.159, p. 36-49, 1928
 Über die geometrische Bedeutung des Rotationswinkels in der Strahlengeometrie, Jan 1928, De Gruyter, 
 Über die geometrische Bedeutung des Rotationswinkels in der Strahlengeometrie, in: Journal für die reine und angewandte Mathematik, Vol.160, p. 33-37, 1929
 Gullstrand, Allvar, Complete Dictionary of Scientific Biography, 2008
 M. Herzberger, Allvar Gullstrand, in Optica Acta, Vol.3 (1960), p. 237–241

References

External links
 Homage to an immortal KUBRICK AND THE LEGENDARY PLANAR 50mm f / 0.7, about a camera objective based on a 1937 draft by Herzberger, and used by Stanley Kubrick for his film "Barry Lyndon"''

1899 births
1982 deaths
Jewish emigrants from Nazi Germany to the United States
20th-century German mathematicians
20th-century German physicists
20th-century American mathematicians